Sind was an administrative division of the Umayyad Caliphate and later of the Abbasid Caliphate in post-classical India, from around 711 CE with the conquest of Sind by the Arab military commander Muhammad ibn Qasim, to around 854 CE with the emergence of the independent dynasties of the Habbarid Emirate and the Multan Emirate. The "Governor of Sind" was an official who administered the caliphates' province over what is now Sindh, Pakistan.

The governor was the chief Muslim official in the province and was responsible for maintaining security in the region. As the leader of the provincial military, he was also in charge of carrying out campaigns against the non-Muslim kingdoms of India. Governors appointed to the region were selected either directly by the caliph or by an authorized subordinate, and remained in office until they either died or were dismissed.

Geography
Sind was a frontier province of the Umayyad and Abbasid caliphates from its conquest in c. 711 until the mid-ninth century. Situated at the far eastern end of the caliphate, it consisted of the territories held by the Muslims in India, which at the time were centered in the Indus region. Sind proper was bounded on the west by Makran, on the northwest by Sijistan and the district of Turan, on the northeast by Multan, on the east by the Thar Desert, on the southeast by the non-Muslim Hind, and on the southwest by the Indian Ocean.

Conquest of Sind 

In the history of the Muslim conquests, Sind was a relatively late achievement, occurring almost a century after the Hijrah (start of Islamic calendar). Military raids against India had been undertaken by the Muslims as early as Umar's reign (634–644), but the pace of expansion in the region was initially slow: in 636, an Arab naval expedition attacked Broach, which had come under the control of the Chalukyas following the submission of Jayabhata of the Gurjaras of Lata, and Thana, but it was soon recalled after achieving some damage and they failed to capture these cities. Several governors were appointed to the Indian frontier and tasked with conducting campaigns in the east. Some of these expeditions were successful, but others ended in defeat and a number of governors were killed while serving there.

According to Derryl N. Maclean, a link between Sind and the early partisans of Caliph Ali or proto-Shi'ites could be traced to Hakim ibn Jabalah al-Abdi, a companion of the Islamic prophet Muhammad, who traveled across Sind to Makran in 649 and presented a report on the area to the caliph. He supported Ali, and died in the Battle of the Camel alongside Sindi Jats. During the reign of Ali, many Jats came under the influence of Islam. Harith ibn Murrah al-Abdi and Sayfi ibn Fil al-Shaybani, both officers of Ali's army, attacked Sindi bandits and chased them to al-Qiqan (present-day Quetta) in 658. Sayfi was one of the seven partisans of Ali who were beheaded alongside Hujr ibn Adi al-Kindi in 660AD, near Damascus.

In the caliphate of Mu'awiya I, the region of Makran was subdued and a garrison was established there. Over the following decades, the Muslims progressed further east, conquering the district of Qusdar and raiding the areas around Qandabil and al-Qiqan.

After marching through Makran and defeating its inhabitants, Muhammad entered Sind and attacked the port city of Daybul, which fell after a siege and was partly colonized by the Muslims. Following this victory, Muhammad moved north and encountered Dahir, whom he defeated and killed. He then spent the next few years campaigning in Sind and Multan, forcing the various cities of the country to submit to him.

This period of conquests continued until 715, when Caliph al-Walid I died; shortly after the accession of Caliph Sulayman, Muhammad was arrested and executed, and a replacement was sent by the government to take control of Sind.

From that time, the Turk Shahis now had to face an additional Muslim threat from the southeast, as did Hindu kingdoms, especially the Maitrakas and the Gurjara-Pratiharas, on their western borders, since the Caliphal province of Sind extended as far as Multan, at the gates of the Punjab, and would last until 854 CE as an Umayyad and then Abbasid dependency.

Umayyad period 

As a result of its conquest, Sind became a province of the caliphate and governors were appointed to administer it. As the commander of a frontier province, the governor was responsible for guarding the country against external incursions, and could carry out raids into Hind (India) at his discretion. The governor's jurisdiction usually also included the neighboring regions of Makran, Turan and Multan; in addition, any territories that he conquered in Hind were added to his area of authority.

In the administrative hierarchy of the Umayyad Caliphate, the responsibility for selecting governors to the province was assigned to the governor of Iraq, or, if that position was vacant, to the governor of Basra. Unless he received specific commands from the caliph, the governor of Iraq had the authority to appoint and dismiss governors to Sind and he was in charge of supervising their activities in the province.

According to the historian Khalifa ibn Khayyat, after the downfall of Muhammad ibn Qasim the responsibilities of the governor of Sind were temporarily divided between two officials, one of whom was in charge of military affairs and the other in charge of taxation. This change was soon rescinded and the next governor, Habib ibn al-Muhallab al-Azdi, had full authority over both the fiscal and military affairs on the province.

As a general rule, provincial governorships in the Umayyad period were held almost exclusively by Arabs, and this trend was reflected in the appointees to Sind during this period. Qaysi–Yamani tribal politics also played a strong role in the selection and dismissal of governors; if the governor of Iraq was Qaysi, then his governor to Sind would likely be Qaysi, and if he was Yamani, his selection would likely be Yamani as well. There were, however, some exceptions; Junayd ibn Abd al-Rahman al-Murri was initially appointed to Sind by a fellow Qaysi, but was allowed to retain his position for two years after the governor of Iraq was replaced with a Yamani.

The governors of Sind in the Umayyad period undertook extensive campaigns against the non-Muslim kingdoms of Hind, but with mixed results. Al-Junayd's campaigns were largely successful, but his successor Tamim ibn Zaid al-Utbi encountered difficulties and the Muslims were forced to retreat from Hind. The next governor, al-Hakam ibn Awana, vigorously campaigned in Hind and initially achieved some victories, but he too experienced a reversal of fortune and was eventually killed. Raids into Hind continued after al-Hakam's death, but no major territorial gains were achieved, and the Muslim presence in India remained largely restricted to the Indus valley region.

As part of his efforts to secure the Muslim position in Sind, al-Hakam constructed the military garrison of al-Mahfuzah, which he made into his capital. Shortly after this, his lieutenant Amr, a son of Muhammad ibn Qasim, built a second city near al-Mahfuzah, which he called al-Mansura. This latter city eventually became the permanent administrative capital of Sind, and it served as the seat of the Umayyad and Abbasid governors.

The names of the caliphal governors of Sind are preserved in the histories of Khalifa ibn Khayyat and al-Ya'qubi. Some differences exist between the two authors' versions; these are noted below. The Futuh al-Buldan by al-Baladhuri, which focuses on the military conquests of the early Muslim state, also contains the names of many of the governors who served in Sind.

Abbasid period 

At the time of the Abbasid Revolution, Sind was in the hands of the anti-Umayyad rebel Mansur ibn Jumhur al-Kalbi. Following their victory over the Umayyads, the Abbasids at first left Mansur in control of the province, but this state of affairs did not last and the new dynasty sent Musa ibn Ka'b al-Tamimi to take over the region. He was able to defeat Mansur and enter Sind, thereby firmly establishing Abbasid control over the province.

After the new dynasty came to power, Sind's administrative status was somewhat ambiguous, with governors being appointed either directly by the caliph or by the governor of Khurasan, Abu Muslim. This situation lasted only until Abu Muslim's murder in 755; thereafter, appointments to Sind were almost always handled by the caliph and the central government.

In the first century of the Abbasid caliphate, governors continued to conduct raids against the non-Muslim kingdoms of Hind, and some minor gains were achieved. The historians also recorded the various struggles of the governors to maintain stability within Sind, as internecine tribal warfare, Alid partisans and disobedient Arab factions intermittently threatened the government's control over the region. Another potential source of trouble came from the governors themselves; a few of the individuals appointed to Sind attempted to rebel against the Abbasids, and had to be subdued by force of arms. In general, however, Abbasid authority in Sind remained effective during this period of their rule.

Under the Abbasids, Arabs continued to frequently occupy the governorship, but over time the selections became somewhat more diverse. Under the caliphs al-Mahdi (775–785) and al-Rashid (786–809), non-Arab clients (mawali) were sometimes appointed to Sind. In the caliphate of al-Ma'mun (813–833), the governorship was given to a member of the Persian Barmakid family, and the province remained under their rule for a number of years. After the Barmakids, the Turkish general Itakh was given control of Sind, although he deputed the actual administration of the province to an Arab. During this period several members of the prominent Muhallabid family served in Sind; their combined administrations spanned over a period of more than three decades. Under al-Rashid, a few minor members of the Abbasid family were also appointed as governors of the province.

Decline of Abbasid authority 

Over the course of the mid-ninth century, Abbasid authority in Sind gradually waned. A new era in the history of the province began in 854, when Umar ibn Abd al-Aziz al-Habbari, a local Arab resident of Sind, was appointed to govern the country. Shortly after this, the central government entered a period of crisis which crippled its ability to maintain its authority in the provinces; this stagnation allowed 'Umar to rule Sind without any interference from the caliphal court at Samarra. 'Umar ended up creating a hereditary dynasty, that of the Habbarids, which ruled in al-Mansura for almost two centuries. Although the Habbarids continued to acknowledge the Abbasids as their nominal suzerains, the effective authority of the caliph largely disappeared and the Habbarids were de facto independent.

In spite of their loss of effective control over Sind, the Abbasid government continued to formally appoint governors to the province. In 871 the caliphal regent Abu Ahmad ibn al-Mutawakkil invested the Saffarid Ya'qub ibn al-Layth with the governorship of Sind. In 875 the general Masrur al-Balkhi was given control of most of the eastern provinces, including Sind. Four years after this, Sind was again assigned to the Saffarids, with Amr ibn al-Layth receiving the appointment. These appointments, however, were purely nominal, and it is unlikely that these individuals exercised any actual authority over the local rulers within the province.

As the central government's authority over Sind declined, the region underwent a period of decentralization. Habbarid authority appears to have been largely restricted to Sind proper, and did not extend to Makran, Turan and Multan, which all broke away under separate dynasties. Some of the rulers in these regions also continued to nominally recognize the caliph as their ruler, but were effectively self-governing; others rejected the caliph's authority altogether and were outright independent. These minor dynasties continued to govern in their respective localities until the early eleventh century, when the Ghaznavids invaded India and annexed most of the Muslim territories in the country.

See also 

 List of Umayyad governors of al-Andalus
 List of caliphal governors of Arminiyah
 List of caliphal governors of Egypt
 List of caliphal governors of Ifriqiyah
 List of Umayyad governors of Iraq
 List of caliphal governors of al-Madinah

Notes

References 
 Al-Baladhuri, Ahmad ibn Jabir. The Origins of the Islamic State, Part II. Trans. Francis Clark Murgotten. New York: Columbia University, 1924.
 
 
 
 The Encyclopaedia of Islam. New Ed. 12 vols. with supplement and indices. Leiden: E.J. Brill, 1960–2005.
 Gabrieli, Francesco. "Muhammad ibn Qasim ath-Thaqafi and the Arab Conquest of Sind." East and West 15/3-4 (1965): 281–295.
 Khalifah ibn Khayyat. Tarikh Khalifah ibn Khayyat. Ed. Akram Diya' al-'Umari. 3rd ed. Al-Riyadh: Dar Taybah, 1985.
 
 Shaban, M. A. The 'Abbasid Revolution. Cambridge, UK: Cambridge University Press, 1970. 
 
 Al-Tabari, Abu Ja'far Muhammad ibn Jarir. The History of al-Tabari. Ed. Ehsan Yar-Shater. 40 vols. Albany, NY: State University of New York Press, 1985–2007.
 Al-Ya'qubi, Ahmad ibn Abu Ya'qub. Historiae, Vol. 2. Ed. M. Th. Houtsma. Leiden: E. J. Brill, 1883.
 

Sind
 
 
Governors